Tonnelle Avenue  is a ground-level station on the Hudson-Bergen Light Rail (HBLR) located at 51st Street in North Bergen, New Jersey. The station opened for service on February 25, 2006. 

Service from the station travels to West Side Avenue in Jersey City at all times. On weekdays, service is also available to Hoboken Terminal. In conjunction with the station, New Jersey Transit operates a 730-space park-and-ride lot on Tonnelle Avenue (U.S. Route 1 & 9), between 49th and 51st Streets.

Currently, the station is the northern terminus for the light rail system, with two tracks and an island platform. The proposed Northern Branch Corridor Project would extend the line from Tonnelle Avenue north into Englewood, in eastern Bergen County.  

Daily and monthly parking is available. Monthly parking passes for the following month are sold on the 19th of each month.

Platform layout

Vicinity
North Bergen Municipal Building
New Durham, North Bergen
Flower Hill Cemetery
Grove Church Cemetery
Hoboken Cemetery
Macphelah Cemetery
Weehawken Cemetery

References

External links

 Subway Nut station photos
 Tonnelle Avenue entrance from Google Maps Street View
 Platform from Google Maps Street View

North Bergen, New Jersey
Hudson-Bergen Light Rail stations
Railway stations in Hudson County, New Jersey
North Hudson, New Jersey
Railway stations in the United States opened in 2006
2006 establishments in New Jersey